Landlines may refer to:
The plural of landline 
Landlines, 2022 book by Raynor Winn